Satya Pal Singh or Satyapal Singh may refer to:
Satya Pal Singh (Uttar Pradesh politician) (born 1955), India's Minister of State for Human Resource Development
Satyapal Singh (Madhya Pradesh politician), Indian politician and member of the Bharatiya Janata Party.
Satyapal Singh Saini (born 1973), Uttar Pradesh politician
Satyapal Singh Yadav, minister of state in Government of India 1998-1999
S. P. Singh Baghel (born 1960), Uttar Pradesh politician